The FIS Ski Tour 2020 was a cross-country skiing competition held as a part of the 2019–20 FIS Cross-Country World Cup. This stage event took place in Sweden and Norway, on ski resorts well-known from other skiing disciplines like alpine skiing or biathlon. The tour began in Östersund, Sweden on 15 February 2020 and concluded with the pursuit stage in Trondheim, Norway, on 23 February 2020. It consisted six stages, which were awarded with reduced number of World Cup points. For the overall standings they received three times the World Cup points compared to a regular individual World Cup event.

Schedule

Overall leadership 
Two main individual classifications were contested in the Ski Tour 2020. The most important was the overall standings, calculated by adding each skier's finishing times on each stage. Time bonuses (time subtracted) were awarded at both sprint stages and at intermediate points during mass start stage. In the sprint stages, thirty skiers were awarded with bonus seconds from 60 seconds for the winners, while on mass start stage the first ten skiers past the intermediate point received from 15 seconds to 1 seconds. The skier with the lowest cumulative time was the overall winner of the Ski Tour.

The second competition was the points standings. The skiers who received the highest number of points during the Tour won the points standings. The points available for each stage finish were determined by the stage's type. The leader was identified by a silver bib.

A total of CHF 480,000, both genders included, were awarded in cash prizes in the race. The overall winners of the Ski Tour received CHF 47,000, with the second and third placed skiers getting CHF 33,840 and CHF 23,500 respectively. All finishers in the top 20 received money. The holders of the overall benefit on each stage they led; the final winners of the points standings earned CHF 6,000. CHF 3,000 was given to the winners of each stage of the race, with smaller amounts given to places 2 and 3.

Overall standings

Overall standings

Points standings

Stages

Stage 1
15 February 2020, Östersund, Sweden
No bonus seconds are awarded on this stage.

Stage 2
16 February 2020, Östersund, Sweden

No bonus seconds are awarded on this stage.

Stage 3
18 February 2020, Åre, Sweden
 Bonus seconds to the 30 skiers that qualifies for the quarter-finals, distributed as following:
 Final: 60–54–48–46–44–42
 Semi-final: 32–30–28–26–24–22
 Quarter-final: 10–10–10–8–8–8–8–8–6–6–6–6–6–4–4–4–4–4

Stage 4
20 February 2020, Meråker, Norway

Stage 4 bonus seconds
 Men: 2 intermediate sprints, bonus seconds to the 10 first skiers (15–12–10–8–6–5–4–3–2–1) past the intermediate point.
 Women: 2 intermediate sprints, bonus seconds to the 10 first skiers (15–12–10–8–6–5–4–3–2–1) past the intermediate point.
 No bonus seconds are awarded at the finish

Stage 5
22 February 2020, Trondheim, Norway
 Bonus seconds to the 30 skiers that qualifies for the quarter-finals, distributed as following:
 Final: 60–54–48–46–44–42
 Semi-final: 32–30–28–26–24–22
 Quarter-final: 10–10–10–8–8–8–8–8–6–6–6–6–6–4–4–4–4–4

Stage 6
23 February 2020, Trondheim, Norway

The race for "Fastest of the Day" counts for 2019–20 FIS Cross-Country World Cup points. No bonus seconds are awarded on this stage.

Points distribution 
The table shows the number of 2019/2020 FIS Cross-Country World Cup points won in the Ski Tour 2020 for men and women.

References

Sources

 
 
 

2019–20 FIS Cross-Country World Cup
2020 in Swedish sport
2020 in Norwegian sport
2020 in cross-country skiing
February 2020 sports events in Europe